Colorado is divided into eight congressional districts, each represented by a member of the United States House of Representatives.

The districts are currently represented in the 118th United States Congress by five Democrats and three Republicans.

History
The Territory of Colorado was represented by one non-voting Delegate to the United States House of Representatives from its organization on Thursday, February 2, 1861, until statehood on Tuesday, August 1, 1876.

The State of Colorado was represented by one United States representative elected at-large from statehood in 1876 until the end of the 52nd United States Congress in 1893.  Colorado was represented by two United States representatives elected from two congressional districts from 1893 until the end of the 57th United States Congress in 1903.  Colorado was represented by three United States representatives elected from two districts and one at-large from 1903 until the end of the 62nd United States Congress in 1913.  Colorado was represented by four United States representatives elected from two districts and two at-large in the 63rd United States Congress from 1913 until 1915.

Since the 1914 United States House of Representatives elections, all U.S. Representatives from the State of Colorado have been elected from congressional districts.  Colorado has been represented by four United States representatives from 1913 until the end of the 92nd United States Congress in 1973, five United States representatives from 1973 until the end of the 97th United States Congress in 1983, six United States representatives from 1983 until the end of the 107th United States Congress in 2003, seven United States representatives from 2003 until the end of the 117th United States Congress in 2023, and eight United States representatives since 2023.

Current districts and representatives
List of members of the United States House delegation from Colorado, their terms, their district boundaries, and their district political ratings according to the CPVI. The delegation has a total of eight members, including five Democrats, and three Republicans.

Historical and present district boundaries
Table of United States congressional district boundary maps in the State of Colorado, presented chronologically. All redistricting events that took place in Colorado between 1973 and 2013 are shown.

Obsolete districts
Colorado's at-large congressional district

See also

United States congressional delegations from Colorado
List of United States senators from Colorado
List of United States representatives from Colorado

References

External links